In enzymology, an aminoglycoside N3'-acetyltransferase is an enzyme that catalyzes the chemical reaction

acetyl-CoA + a 2-deoxystreptamine antibiotic  CoA + N3'-acetyl-2-deoxystreptamine antibiotic

Thus, the two substrates of this enzyme are acetyl-CoA and 2-deoxystreptamine antibiotic, whereas its two products are CoA and N3'-acetyl-2-deoxystreptamine antibiotic.

This enzyme belongs to the family of transferases, specifically those acyltransferases transferring groups other than aminoacyl groups.  The systematic name of this enzyme class is acetyl-CoA:2-deoxystreptamine-antibiotic N3'-acetyltransferase. Other names in common use include 3'-aminoglycoside acetyltransferase, and 3-N-aminoglycoside acetyltransferase.

References

 

EC 2.3.1
Enzymes of unknown structure